Fundina is a village in the municipality of Podgorica, Montenegro.

Etymology
The name Fundina derives from Albanian literally meaning "end or ending point" from "fund"(end) and "ina" suffix.

Demographics
According to the 2011 census, its population was 237.

References

Populated places in Podgorica Municipality
Albanian communities in Montenegro